Cyclostomatida or Cyclostomata, are an order of stenolaemate bryozoans consisting of 7+ suborders, 59+ families, 373+ genera, 666+ species.

 Suborder Articulina (2+ families, 9+ genera, 10+ species)
 Family Crisiidae (8+ genera, 9+ species)
 Family Crisuliporidae (1+ genera, 1+ species)
 Suborder Paleotubuliporina (4+ families, 4+ genera, 47+ species)
 Family Corynotrypidae (4+ genera, 27+ species)
 Family Sagenellidae (2+ genera, 2+ species)
 Family Crownoporidae (7+ genera, 17+ species)
 Family Kukersellidae (1+ genera, 1+ species) 
 Suborder Tubuliporina (22 families, 175+ genera, 384+ species)
 Family Stomatoporidae (8+ genera, 16+ species)
 Family Cinctiporidae (4+ genera, 8+ species)
 Family Oncousoeciidae (5+ genera, 47+ species)
 Family Oncousoeciidae (22+ genera, 69+ species)
 Family Tubuliporidae (7+ genera, 10+ species)
 Family Diploclemidae (1+ Genus 1+ species)
 Family Multiparsidae (1+ genera, 1+ species)
 Family Diploclemidae (40+ genera, 74+ species)
 Family Celluliporidae (8+ genera, 8+ species)
 Family Plagioeciidae (38+ genera, 64+ species)
 Family Eleidae (8+ genera, 8+ species)
 Family terviidae (4+ genera, 6+ species)
 Family Spiroporidae (1+ Genus, 1+ species)
 Family Diastoporidae (4+ genera, 7+ species)
 Family Annectocymidae (1+ genera, 5+ species)
 Family Bereniceidae (1+ genera, 1+ species)
 Family Filisparsidae (3+ genera, 3+ species)
 Family Mecynoeciidae (1+ genera, 1+ species)
 Family Diaperoeciidae (3+ genera, 3+ species)
 Family Entalophoridae (11+ genera, 11+ species)
 Family Pustuloporidae (3+ genera, 3+ species)
 Suborder Fascilculina (8+ families, 34+ genera, 55+ species)
 Family Frondiporidae (9+ genera, 11+ species)
 Family Fasciculiporidae (1+ genera, 1+ species)
 Family Fascigeridae (1+ genera, 1+ species)
 Family Theonoidae (14+ genera, 23+ species)
 Family Actinoporidae (1+ genera, 9+ species)
 Family Siphoniotyphlidae (2+ genera, 2+ species)
 Family Hastingsiidae (1+ genera, 3+ species)
 Family Semiceidae (5+ genera, 5+ species)
 Suborder Cancellata (11+ families, 89+ genera, 99+ species)
 Family Horneridae (5+ genera, 8+ species)
 Family Stigmatoechidae (1+ genera, 1+ species)
 Family Stegohorneridae (1+ genera, 1+ species)
 Family Petaloporidae (13+ genera, 13+ species)
 Family Calvetiidae (1+ genera, 1+ species)
 Family Crisinidae (15+ genera, 18+ species)
 Family Crassodiscoporidae (1+ genera, 1+ species)
 Family Ctyididae (27+ genera, 28+ species)
 Family Pseudidmoneidae (1+ genera, 1+ species)
 Family Radioporidae (23+ genera, 26+ species)
 Family Canaliporidae (1+ genera, 1+ species)
 Suborder Cerioporina (10+ families, 60+ genera, 69+ species)
 Family Cerioporidae (40+ genera, 47+ species)
 Family Heteroporidae (2+ genera, 2+ species)
 Family Leiosoeciidae (4+ genera, 4+ species)
 Family Densiporidae (1+ genera, 1+ species)
 Family Canuellidae (1+ genera, 1+ species)
 Family Tretocycloeciidae (1+ genera, 1+ species)
 Family Cavidae (3+ genera, 5+ species)
 Family Corymboporidae (4+ genera, 4+ species)
 Family Gungellidae (1+ genera, 1+ species)
 Family Pseudocerioporidae (1+ genera, 1+ species)
 Suborder Rectangulata (2+ families, 2+ genera, 2+ species)
 Family Lichenoporidae (1+ genera, 1+ species)
 Family Disporellidae (1+ genera, 1+ species)

References
 http://www.alientravelguide.com/science/biology/life/animals/bryozoa/stenolae/cyclosto/

Cyclostomatida
Bryozoan families